This is a list of anime (including live-action and tokusatsu television series) distributed by TV Tokyo, along with regular and special news and sport programs. Dame Oyaji was the first anime that originally aired on TV Tokyo.

Anime series (current)

Anime series (all)

1970s

1980s

1990s

2020s

Live-action and tokusatsu series
Spider-Man
Daimajin Kanon
Chouseishin Series
The Gransazers
El Chavo
The Justirisers
Sazer X
Cutie Honey: The Live

The Fuccons
K-tai Investigator 7
Tomica Hero Series
Tomica Hero: Rescue Force
Tomica Hero: Rescue Fire
Ultra Series
Ultraman Retsuden/Shin Ultraman Retsuden
Ultraman Ginga
Ultraman Ginga S
Ultraman X
Ultraman Orb
Ultraman Zero: The Chronicle
Ultraman Geed
Ultraman Orb: The Chronicle
Ultraman R/B
Ultraman New Generation Chronicle
Ultraman Taiga
Ultraman Chronicle Zero & Geed
Ultraman Z
Girls × Heroine Series
Idol × Warrior Miracle Tunes!
Magical × Heroine Magimajo Pures!
Secret × Heroine Phantomirage!
Police × Heroine Lovepatrina!

Drama 24 
 Yukemuri Sniper
 Uramiya Honpo
 URAKARA
 Majisuka Gakuen
 Y. Brave and Devil's Castle

Theater Gold 
 24 TWENTY FOUR Season 5
The Road to El Dorado
Sinbad: Legend of the Seven Seas
Treasure Planet
Atlantis: The Lost Empire

Special programs
 Sunday Big Valiety
 Monday Premiere!
 New year wide Historical play (every January)
 TV Champion
 Wang playoff gluttony
 Sumidagawa Fireworks Festival (every July)
 Billboard Japan Music Awards

Television programs

News programs
 TXN News
 News Morning Satellite
 E Morning
 NEWS Answer
 World Business Satellite
 Yasuhiro Tase's Weekly News Bookstore

Economic programs
 Nikkei special The Dawn of Gaia
 Nikkei special The Cambria Palace

Documentary programs
 Beauty giants
 Solomon flow

Information programs
 Daily
 7 Studio Bratch!
 Ladies 4

 Saturday
 Ad-machick Tengoku

Variety programs 
 Kaiun Nandemo Kanteidan
 Ariehen World
 Yarisugi Kozy
 Japanese General Honke (、TV Osaka)
 Chokotto iikoto - Takashi Okamura & Hong Kong Happy project
 George Tokoro's School is a place where I not tell
 Takeshi's Nippon no Mikata
 Moya-Moya Summers 2
 Muscat Night
 Weekly AKB
 AKB Kousagi Dojo
 Valiety 7
 OL saw dispatch!
 Gokujou dikara
 God-Tan
 Kira-Kira Afro (TV Osaka)
 Kudamaki Hachibei X （）
 Itao Roman
 Ari-Ken
 Shinsuke Minami DEKO-BOKO Daigakkou
 ASAYAN
 You wa Nani shi ni Nippon He
 Little Tokyo Live (リトルトーキョーライフ Ritorutōkyōraifu) every Wednesday, around midnight

Travel & gourmet programs
 Ii-tabi Yume-Kibun
 Drive a GO! GO!
 Saturday Special
 Stay at the countryside?

Music programs
 Japan Countdown
 Enka no Hanamichi
 Yan-yan Music studio

Sports programs
LPGA Of Japan
 Neo Sports
 Winning Horse racing
 J1 League
 UEFA Champions League (1992–present)
 UEFA Europa League (2000–present) (Formerly known as UEFA Cup)
 UEFA Europa Conference League (2021–present)
 UEFA Super Cup (2005–present)

External links
TV Tokyo anime website
 
TV Tokyo press release on Japanese Animated Television Series

TV Tokyo
TV Tokyo
TV Tokyo